Phryganopsis asperatella is a moth in the subfamily Arctiinae. It was described by Francis Walker in 1864. It is found in Cameroon, Kenya, Niger, Nigeria and South Africa.

References

Moths described in 1864
Lithosiini